The Lake Buccaneer is an American four-seat, light amphibious aircraft derived from the Colonial C-2 Skimmer, itself a development of the three-seat Colonial C-1 Skimmer.

Development
The Colonial Aircraft of Sanford, Maine developed the C-2 Skimmer in the 1950s as a four-seat variant of the earlier three-seat C-1 Skimmer. The name was changed to Lake in 1959, along with some design improvements. Produced until 1970, this version was designated as the Lake LA-4 Amphibian.

From 1969-1972 the company sold some LA-4s modified under a Supplemental Type Certificate as flying boats, without landing gear, but with removable beaching wheels, under the name Lake LA-4S Seaplane. 

In 1970 a  fuel injected Lycoming IO-360 engine was fitted and the resulting aircraft named the Buccaneer. This model replaced both the LA-4 and Seaplane in production and has a higher cruise speed as well as  increased gross weight.

A military version was called the Seawolf.

Design
The LA-4 is a cantilever, shoulder-wing monoplane amphibian with a single-step all-metal hull with retractable tricycle landing gear. It is powered by an Lycoming O-360  piston engine in pusher configuration, pylon-mounted above the hull.

Variants

LA-4 Amphibian
Production version with a Lycoming O-360 A1A , type certified 26 July 1960. This differed from the Colonial C-2 in having four foot greater span, revised nose, doors, higher gross weight and reinforcement of the wing and wing-to-fuselage carry-through structure.
LA-4A
Shorter bow from the Colonial C-2, only two built. Type certified 1 June 1960.
LA-4P
LA-4 prototype, one only built. Type certified 21 June 1960.
LA-4S Seaplane
Version without wheeled landing gear, produced 1969-72 under STC SA781EA approved 8 July 1969 and amended 28 November 1969, issued to Revo, Inc.
LA-4T
Turbocharged version with  Lycoming O-360 A1D engine and Rayjay turbocharger. Not produced.
LA-4-200 Buccaneer
Lycoming IO-360 A1B 
LA-4-200EP "Lake EP"
Lycoming IO-360 A1B6  Standard fuel floats

Specifications (LA-4-200 Buccaneer)

See also

References

External links 

Private Flight Team Test No 19 Lake - LA-4-200 Buccaneer
FAA Type Certificate Data Sheet 1A13

1950s United States civil utility aircraft
Single-engined pusher aircraft
Buccaneer
Amphibious aircraft
Cruciform tail aircraft
Shoulder-wing aircraft
Flying boats